Nalanda Mahila College, is a general degree women's colleges in Biharsharif, Bihar. It is a constituent unit of Patliputra University. College offers undergraduate courses in science and arts.

Departments

Science

Chemistry
Physics 
Mathematics
Zoology
Botany

Arts 

English
Hindi
Economics
Political Science
Philosophy
Psychology
History

Accreditation
Nalanda Mahila College was accredited by the National Assessment and Accreditation Council (NAAC).

References

External links

Constituent colleges of Patliputra University
Universities and colleges in Bihar
Educational institutions in India with year of establishment missing